Ibe Hautekiet (born 13 April 2002) is a Belgian professional footballer who plays as a defender for Standard Liège.

Club career
Hautekiet began his career at the youth academy of Club Brugge. On 22 August 2020, Hautekiet made his debut for Brugge's reserve side, Club NXT in the Belgian First Division B against RWDM47. He started as NXT lost 0–2.

On 31 January 2023, Hautekiet signed a four-and-a-half-year contract with Standard Liège.

Career statistics

Club

References

External links

2002 births
Living people
Belgian footballers
Belgium youth international footballers
Association football midfielders
Club NXT players
SL16 FC players
Challenger Pro League players